George Irwin (born 7 January 1891) was manager of the English football clubs Crystal Palace (1939–47) and Darlington (1950–52). He also made appearances in the Football League for Crystal Palace and Reading.

Playing career
Irwin began his career at West Bromwich Albion, but did not make a first team appearance for the club. He signed for Crystal Palace in 1921, as understudy to Jack Alderson. After two seasons he moved on to Reading where he spent a further three seasons before retiring as a player.

Coaching career
Irwin then moved into coaching, initially with Southend United, before moving to Sheffield Wednesday where he also served as assistant manager, and was on the staff when Wednesday won the 1935 FA Cup Final. Irwin returned to Crystal Palace, as coach, in 1937 before being appointed manager in 1939. He remained with Palace during the years of wartime football winning regional league titles in 1940, 1941 and 1946. However the first post-war season (1946–7) resulted in a disappointing eighteenth place in the Third Division South and Irwin resigned thereafter. He remained at Crystal Palace as a scout before being appointed manager of Darlington in 1950, where he remained for two seasons.

Managerial statistics

References

External links

George Irwin at holmesdale.net

Crystal Palace F.C. managers
Darlington F.C. managers
1891 births
Year of death missing
Crystal Palace F.C. players
West Bromwich Albion F.C. players
Reading F.C. players
Sportspeople from Smethwick
English Football League players
Association football goalkeepers
Sheffield Wednesday F.C. non-playing staff
English footballers
Date of death missing